Sera may refer to:

People 
 Ryu Sera (born 1987), South Korean singer
 Sera Cahoone (born 1975), Seattle-based singer and musician

Places 
 Sera, Hiroshima, a town in Japan
 Sera District, Hiroshima 
 Sera Monastery, Lhasa, Tibet

Media 
 Sera (Robotech character), a fictional character from the television series Robotech
 "Será", a 1979 song by José José from the album Si Me Dejas Ahora
 "Será", a 1985 song by Legião Urbana from the album Legião Urbana
 "Será", a 1990 song by Franco de Vita from the album Extranjero
 "Será", a 1991 song by Ricardo Montaner
 "Será", a 2004 song by Lu from the album Lu
 "Será", a 2006 song by Sin Bandera from the album Pasado
 Sera, an album by Valeriy Meladze
 Sera, the fictional planet upon which the video game series Gears of War is set
 Sera, a protagonist from the Shin Megami Tensei: Digital Devil Saga series
 Sera (Dragon Age), a character in the 2014 video game Dragon Age: Inquisition
 Sera, a character from Doubutsu Sentai Zyuohger, a Japanese television series

Acronyms 
 Sierra Northern Railway, which has the reporting mark SERA
 Single European Railway Area, an area inside the European Union where the European Train Control System is in use
 Suburban Electric Railway Association, based at the Electric Railway Museum, Warwickshire, England
 Socialist Environment and Resources Association, an independent campaign group affiliated with the United Kingdom Labour Party
 Southern Education and Research Alliance (South Africa)
 Standardised European Rules of the Air is a European Regulation on flying and air traffic control
 Strengthening Emergency Response Abilities (SERA) Project or simply Strengthening Emergency Response Abilities Project (Ethiopia)

Other uses 
 Sera, a language spoken in Papua New Guinea
 Sera (company), a German-based manufacturer of fish foods and other aquarium accessories
 Toyota Sera, a small 2+2 coupe built solely for the Japanese market

See also 
 Sara (disambiguation)
 Sarah
 Serra (disambiguation)
 Serum (disambiguation)
 Que sera (disambiguation)